Sean Greenhalgh (born July 15, 1982) is a former professional lacrosse player. Sean is a cousin to Charlie Mulgrew, a Scottish footballer, who plays for Dundee United.

Junior career
Born in St. Catharines, Ontario, Greenhalgh had a very successful junior career with the St. Catharines Athletics of the OLA Junior A Lacrosse League. In 2000, he was awarded the "Joey Nieuwendyk Award" for Rookie of the Year. The following year, he would win the "Gaylord Powless Sportsmanship Award", and would help lead would lead the Athletics to their first Minto Cup in 10 years.

In 2002, with arguably one of the greatest junior teams ever assembled, Greenhalgh and future professionals Craig Conn, Billy Dee Smith, Matt Vinc, Athan Iannucci, Rory Glaves and Mike Hominuck, led the Athletics to an undefeated season and their second league championship in a row. However, the A's would lose the Minto Cup to the Burnaby Lakers.

In Greenhalgh's final season, the Athletics won their third straight league championship and defeated the Burnaby Lakers to win their second Minto Cup in three years.

High school career
Greenhalgh was a five-year starter at Holy Cross Catholic Secondary School, where along with fellow National Lacrosse League players Craig Conn, Matt Vinc, and Billy Dee Smith, won 2 OFSAA championships, and created a dynasty at the school for many more years in the sport.

College career
After high school, Greenhalgh played for Cornell University, where he was named 2005 Ivy League Player of the Year. He is second in career goals scored (136) and fourth in career points (169) at Cornell.

Professional career

NLL
Greenhalgh was drafted in the first round (3rd overall) of the 2005 NLL entry draft by the Philadelphia Wings. He had an impressive rookie season:
 Led the Wings in goals (31)
 Tied with Dan Marohl for the lead in points (73)
 Won Overall Player of the Week twice, Offensive Player of the Week once, and Rookie of the Week five times
 Named Rookie of the Month for January
 Given the 2006 National Lacrosse League Sportsmanship Award

In July 2007, Greenhalgh was traded to the Buffalo Bandits in a three-team blockbuster trade, but tore a knee ligament before the season began and missed the entire 2008 season (the same season in which the Bandits won the Champion's Cup). Greenhalgh played six games with the Bandits during the 2010 season. He did not play the entire 2011 season and then retired from professional lacrosse.

MLL
Greenhalgh was selected by the Los Angeles Riptide in the second round (19th overall) in the 2008 MLL Supplemental Draft. He was also named to the Pre-Season Active roster of the Toronto Nationals for their inaugural season in 2009.

International career
Greenhalgh participated in the 2007 World Indoor Lacrosse Championships, representing Scotland (Greenhalgh has dual citizenship through his mother).

Statistics

NLL

OLA

NCAA

Awards

References

External links
 Sean Greenhalgh Bio Cornell University

1982 births
Living people
Buffalo Bandits players
Canadian lacrosse players
Canadian people of Scottish descent
Cornell Big Red men's lacrosse players
Lacrosse forwards
Lacrosse people from Ontario
National Lacrosse League major award winners
Philadelphia Wings players
Sportspeople from St. Catharines